Lee Allen Tergesen (born July 8, 1965) is an American actor. He is known for his roles in Weird Science, as Tobias Beecher in HBO's prison drama Oz, and as Evan Wright in Generation Kill, as well as guest starring in many other series. In film, he is known for his portrayal of Terry in Wayne's World and Wayne's World 2, as well as Vincent Corey in Monster.

Early life
Tergesen was born in Ivoryton, Connecticut and graduated from Valley Regional High School in nearby Deep River. He moved to New York to try to become an actor. He graduated from the American Musical and Dramatic Academy (AMDA)'s two-year program in Manhattan, where, from 1986 to 1989, he worked at the Empire Diner. "I wasn't a great waiter. I was funny, but I gave a lot of attitude", he told Rosie magazine in March 2002. He added: "The place is like a vortex for me". He met Tom Fontana, the future creator of Oz, at the diner.

He did some stage work during this time. "I was doing plays all the time, but there's no money in it", Tergesen said in a 1995 Los Angeles Times article. "After graduation, I thought I'd be making a living at it." He went to Los Angeles to help Fontana move into his house. While dining at a restaurant on the day after arriving in Los Angeles, a casting director and friend of Fontana's asked Tergesen if he was an actor. "He told me there was a part in this movie and at that time, I couldn't imagine what it could be," Tergesen told the L.A. Times. The movie turned out to be Point Break, starring Keanu Reeves and Patrick Swayze. "It was the beginning of me never having to do anything else but act", he told LT.com in 1990.

Career
Tergesen began his career with a bit role in the 1991 prime-time aired pilot Acting Sheriff.

He then appeared in Wayne's World (1992) and Wayne's World 2 (1993), in the 1994 series Weird Science as Chester "Chett" Donnelly, and had a recurring role in the first season of Homicide: Life on the Street.

He portrayed Tobias Beecher on HBO's Oz (1997), a critically acclaimed role until the series ended in 2003. His film credits include Point Break, Shaft, Monster, The Forgotten, The Texas Chainsaw Massacre: The Beginning, Cast A Deadly Spell and Wild Iris. He has made several appearances in TV shows such as ER, Rescue Me, CSI: Crime Scene Investigation, Criminal Minds, The 4400, House, Law & Order and two of its spin-offs, Law & Order: Criminal Intent and Law & Order: Special Victims Unit. He played a murderous Navy SEAL, Andrew Larrick, in Season 2 of The Americans on the FX television network.

He played an Alcoholics Anonymous sponsor in the second season of Desperate Housewives, becoming romantically involved with Bree Van de Kamp. He appeared in the USA Network series Royal Pains and in Seasons 4–5 of the Lifetime Network series Army Wives. He played Evan Wright in the HBO mini-series Generation Kill.

He has appeared on stage in the Off-Broadway productions of Long Lost (2019) by Donald Margulies and Rapture, Blister, Burn in 2012 at Playwrights Horizons, among others.

Personal life
Tergesen married Yuko Otomo in 2011. Their daughter was born December 5, 2012; their son was born in 2017.

Filmography

Film
Sources: tcm.com allmovie.com

Television
Source: allmovie.com

Awards and nominations

References

External links
 
 

1965 births
Living people
American male film actors
American male television actors
American people of Norwegian descent
American people of Swedish descent
Male actors from Connecticut
People from Essex, Connecticut
American Musical and Dramatic Academy alumni